Michael Carrington may refer to:
 Michael Carrington (figure skater), British figure skater
 Michael Carrington (voice actor), American television comedy writer and voice actor
 Michael Carrington (television executive) (born 1961), Broadcast media executive 
 Michael Carrington, a fictional character in the 1982 film Grease 2, portrayed by Maxwell Caulfield
 Michael A. Carrington, Barbados politician, see list of speakers of the House of Assembly of Barbados